Roanoke Station may refer to:

 Roanoke Station, Indiana, an unincorporated community
 Roanoke station (Virginia), an Amtrak station